IPSC Kazakhstan is the Kazakh association for practical shooting under the International Practical Shooting Confederation.

External links 
 Official homepage of IPSC Kazakhstan

References 

Regions of the International Practical Shooting Confederation
Sports governing bodies in Kazakhstan
Sports organizations established in 2010
2010 establishments in Kazakhstan